In geometry, the small stellated dodecahedron is a Kepler-Poinsot polyhedron, named by Arthur Cayley, and with Schläfli symbol {,5}. It is one of four nonconvex regular polyhedra. It is composed of 12 pentagrammic faces, with five pentagrams meeting at each vertex.

It shares the same vertex arrangement as the convex regular icosahedron. It also shares the same edge arrangement with the great icosahedron, with which it forms a degenerate uniform compound figure.

It is the second of four stellations of the dodecahedron (including the original dodecahedron itself).

The small stellated dodecahedron can be constructed analogously to the pentagram, its two-dimensional analogue, via the extension of the edges (1-faces) of the core polytope until a point is reached where they intersect.

Topology

If the pentagrammic faces are considered as 5 triangular faces, it shares the same surface topology as the pentakis dodecahedron, but with much taller isosceles triangle faces, with the height of the pentagonal pyramids adjusted so that the five triangles in the pentagram become coplanar. The critical angle is atan(2) above the dodecahedron face.

If we regard it as having 12 pentagrams as faces, with these pentagrams meeting at 30 edges and 12 vertices, we can compute its genus using Euler's formula

and conclude that the small stellated dodecahedron has genus 4. This observation, made by Louis Poinsot, was initially confusing, but Felix Klein showed in 1877 that the small stellated dodecahedron could be seen as a branched covering of the Riemann sphere by a Riemann surface of genus 4, with branch points at the center of each pentagram. In fact this Riemann surface, called Bring's curve, has the greatest number of symmetries of any Riemann surface of genus 4: the symmetric group  acts as automorphisms

Images

In art 

A small stellated dodecahedron can be seen in a floor mosaic in St Mark's Basilica, Venice by Paolo Uccello circa 1430. The same shape is central to two lithographs by M. C. Escher: Contrast (Order and Chaos) (1950) and Gravitation (1952).

Related polyhedra 

Its convex hull is the regular convex icosahedron. It also shares its edges with the great icosahedron; the compound with both is the great complex icosidodecahedron.

There are four related uniform polyhedra, constructed as degrees of truncation. The dual is a great dodecahedron. The dodecadodecahedron is a rectification, where edges are truncated down to points.

The truncated small stellated dodecahedron can be considered a degenerate uniform polyhedron since edges and vertices coincide, but it is included for completeness. Visually, it looks like a regular dodecahedron on the surface, but it has 24 faces in overlapping pairs. The spikes are truncated until they reach the plane of the pentagram beneath them. The 24 faces are 12 pentagons from the truncated vertices and 12 decagons taking the form of doubly-wound pentagons overlapping the first 12 pentagons.  The latter faces are formed by truncating the original pentagrams.  When an -gon is truncated, it becomes a -gon.  For example, a truncated pentagon  becomes a decagon , so truncating a pentagram  becomes a doubly-wound pentagon  (the common factor between 10 and 2 mean we visit each vertex twice to complete the polygon).

See also
 Compound of small stellated dodecahedron and great dodecahedron

References

Further reading

External links 
 

Polyhedral stellation
Regular polyhedra
Kepler–Poinsot polyhedra